Drepanotrema kermatoides is a species of gastropods belonging to the family Planorbidae.

The species is found in Southern America.

References

Planorbidae
Gastropods described in 1835